Cardinal Wiseman Catholic School is a non-selective comprehensive state secondary school in Kingstanding; an inner-city suburb of Birmingham, England.  It is named after Cardinal Nicholas Wiseman. This school accepts both sexes and accepts both Catholics and non-Catholics.

Notable pupils 
 Alison Hammond, actor and television presenter

References

External links

Cardinal Wiseman Catholic School official website

Secondary schools in Birmingham, West Midlands
Catholic secondary schools in the Archdiocese of Birmingham
Voluntary aided schools in England